Coleophora dentatella is a moth of the family Coleophoridae. It is found in southern Russia.

The larvae feed on Acanthophyllum elatius. They create a silky case uniformly covered with sand. At end of the development, the slender and curved caudal part is discarded. The valve are three-sided and the length of the completed case is 12–15 mm for males and 8–12 mm for females. Larvae can be found in June and (after diapause) again from April to the beginning of May.

References

dentatella
Moths described in 1967
Moths of Europe